Greenlandic Americans (Greenlandic: Kalaallit Amerikkarmiut) are Americans of Greenlandic descent.

Greenlandic Americans are often categorized as Scandinavian or Danish Americans, because of Greenland's status as an autonomous territory of Denmark. Some are in fact of Danish descent, though many are of Inuit ancestry, which is culturally distinct despite geographic similarities.

Notable Greenlandic Americans
 Amandla Stenberg, actress
 Karina Møller, singer at Pamyua
 Maligiaq Padilla, kayaker
 Minik Wallace
 Simon Lynge, singer

See also

 European Americans
 Hyphenated American
 Nordic and Scandinavian Americans

References 

American people of Greenlandic descent
Danish American
Greenlandic diaspora